HMS Snipe was a 6-gun  built for the Royal Navy during the 1820s. She was broken up in 1860.

Description
The ship's tonnage was 122 tons burthen. The Nightingale class was armed with two 6-pounder cannon and four 6-pounder carronades. The ships had a crew of 34 officers and ratings.

Construction and career
Snipe, the second ship of her name to serve in the Royal Navy after the gun-brig HMS Snipe, was ordered in 1822, laid down in October 1827 at Pembroke Dockyard, Wales, and launched on 28 June 1828. She was completed on 6 September 1828 at Plymouth Dockyard.

Notes

References

Nightingale-class cutter
1828 ships
Ships built in Pembroke Dock